Yatong is a Tibetan pop singer from Kham, the eastern province of traditional Tibet. Yatong was born in Dege in Kham. He's is a well known singer in and is popular with Tibetans in Tibet as well as those who live in exile.
Yatong's fame largely tibetan so little is known of him in the western world

Yatong is known to have been in trouble with Chinese authorities over some of his songs, which they interpreted to have had political overtones.

See also
 Music of Tibet
 Music of China

References

 (minor mention)

21st-century Tibetan male singers
Living people
Year of birth missing (living people)